The 1876 West Aberdeenshire by-election was fought on 10 May 1876.  The byelection was fought due to the resignation of the incumbent Liberal MP, William McCombie.  It was won by the Liberal candidate Lord Douglas Gordon.

References

1876 in Scotland
1870s elections in Scotland
Politics of the county of Aberdeen
History of Aberdeenshire
1876 elections in the United Kingdom
Aberdeenshire West
19th century in Aberdeenshire